Charles Henry Arthurs (1881–1932) was an English footballer who played in the Football League for Gainsborough Trinity and Preston North End.

References

1881 births
1932 deaths
English footballers
Association football midfielders
English Football League players
Rotherham County F.C. players
Gainsborough Trinity F.C. players
Gillingham F.C. players
Preston North End F.C. players
Worksop Town F.C. players
Mardy A.F.C. players
Pontypridd F.C. players
Ebbw Vale F.C. players